The Church of St. Nicholas in Šid is Serbian Orthodox church in Vojvodina, Serbia. The church is dedicated to St. Nicholas. It is the primary centrally located Eastern Orthodox church in the town and a protected cultural monument. The building was constructed in the second half of the 18th century and completed in 1780. At the time, modern day Vojvodina was a part of the Habsburg monarchy in which Šid was located close to the Ottoman Serbia. At the time of the construction of the Eastern Orthodox church in Šid, Habsburg Monarchy (nominally protector of the Roman Catholic church ever since the time of Counter-Reformation) implemented numerous legal reforms such as Declaratory Rescript of the Illyrian Nation and Patent of Toleration which improved legal standing of the Eastern Orthodox subjects.

The church in Šid is a single-nave building with a semicircular apse and a high bell tower. The iconostasis was painted in 1767 by Grigorije Nikolić, a painter from Zemun. Sombor painter Jovan Nedeljković was invited to renew the iconostasis in 1825. The building is facing east-west direction with entry door and bell tower at the western wall.

See also
 Privina Glava Monastery
 Eparchy of Srem
 Syrmia
 Serbs of Vojvodina

References

18th-century Eastern Orthodox church buildings
Serbian Orthodox church buildings in Vojvodina
Cultural Monuments of Great Importance (Serbia)